Gold Edition is a 3-disc box set by Emerson, Lake & Palmer released in 2007. The Box Set released in the UK under the label Nun Entertainment Edel and produced Greg Lake.

Track listing

Disc 1
"Take a Pebble"
"Lucky Man"
"Tarkus"
"Nut Rocker (Live)"
"Hoedown"

Disc 2
"Trilogy"
"Still...You Turn Me On"
"Jerusalem (Live)"
"Pirates"
"Tiger in a Spotlight"
"All I Want Is You"
"The Gambler"

Disc 3
"Pictures at an Exhibition (Live)"
"Black Moon"
"Better Days"
"Romeo and Juliet (Live)"
"Daddy"
"Karn Evil 9: 2nd Impression, Part 2 (Live)"
"Touch and Go (Live)"

Personnel

Band members
Keith Emerson - keyboards
Greg Lake - bass, guitars, vocals
Carl Palmer - percussion, drums

External links

Albums produced by Greg Lake
Emerson, Lake & Palmer compilation albums
2007 compilation albums